Riad (also spelled Riyad or Riyadh) is a masculine Arabic given name and surname, meaning "meadows", "gardens".

People with the given name
 Riad al-Asaad (born 1961), commander of the Free Syrian Army
 Riad Asmat (born 1971), Malaysian businessman
 Riad Bajić (born 1994), Bosnian footballer
 Riad Benayad (born 1996), Algerian footballer
 Riad Benchadi (born 1978), Algerian footballer
 Riad Beyrouti (born 1944), Syrian painter
 Riad Chibani (born 1964), Algerian judoka
 Riad Darar (born 1954), Syrian activist and author
 Riad Hammadou (born 1976), Algerian footballer
 Riad Higazy (1919–1967), Egyptian earth scientist
 Riad Ismat (1947–2020), Syrian politician
 Riad Jarjour, Syrian Christian clergyman
 Riaad Moosa (born 1977), Indian-born South African comedian
 Riad Nouri (born 1985), French-Algerian footballer
 Riad Rahal (born 1950), Lebanese Greek Orthodox surgeon and politician
 Riad Ribeiro (born 1981), Brazilian volleyballer
 Riad Salamé (born 1950), Lebanese banker and governor
 Riad al-Saray (1975–2010), Iraqi journalist, television presenter, lawyer, and politician
 Riad Seif (born 1946), Syrian political dissident and businessman
 Riad Shehata (–died 1942), Egyptian photographer
 Riad Al Solh, first prime minister of Lebanon
 Riad Al Sunbati (1906–1981), Egyptian composer and musician
 Riad Taha (1927–1980), Lebanese journalist
 Riad al-Turk (born 1930), Syrian politician
 Riad Yassin (born 1955), Yemeni Foreign Minister
 Riad Yunes (born 1928), Dominican sports shooter

Riyad
 Riyad Naasan Agha (born 1947), Syrian politician
 Riyadh Al-Azzawi, Iraqi-born British kickboxer
 Riyadh Khalaf, (born 1991) Irish broadcaster, author, and YouTuber
 Riyad Hassan El-Khoudary (born 1943), Palestinian academic
 Riyad Mahrez (born 1991), Algerian footballer
 Riyad al-Maliki, Palestinian politician
 Riyadh Roberts, the legal name of rapper YoungstaCPT

People with the surname
 Ali Mohamed Riad (1904–?), Egyptian footballer
 Hussein Riad (1897–1965), Egyptian actor
 Khadiga Riad (1914–1981), Egyptian painter 
 Mahmoud Riad (1917–1992), Egyptian diplomat
 Mohamed Riad (born 1927), Egyptian scholar and geographer
 Mohamed Ali Riad (1927–1958), Egyptian fencer
 Tarek Riad (born 1960), Egyptian sport shooter
 Tomas Riad (born 1959), Swedish linguist
 Wael Riad (born 1981), Egyptian footballer

See also

 Riyadh the facilitator, pseudonym
 Riaz (name)
 Riyadh (disambiguation)
 Riad (disambiguation)

Arabic-language surnames
Arabic masculine given names